Bulgak is a Russian surname. Notable people with the surname include:

Adut Bulgak (born 1992), South Sudanese-Canadian basketball player
Vladimir Bulgak (born 1941), Russian engineer, bureaucrat, and politician

See also
Bulgakov